The  was a Japanese light bomber aircraft of World War II. It was a single-engine, two-seat, mid-wing, cantilever monoplane with a fixed tailwheel undercarriage. During the war, it was known by the Allies by the name Mary.

Design and development
The Ki-32 was developed in response to a May 1936 Imperial Japanese Army specification to replace the Kawasaki Ki-3 light bomber with a completely indigenously designed and built aircraft. Mitsubishi and Kawasaki were requested to build two prototypes each by December 1936.

The first Kawasaki prototype flew in March 1937; seven more prototypes were produced. Being very similar in layout and performance, the main difference between the Kawasaki Ki-32 and its Mitsubishi Ki-30 rival was in the choice of an engine. The Mitsubishi design used the Nakajima Ha-5 14-cylinder air-cooled radial engine, whereas Kawasaki opted for their own Kawasaki Ha-9-II inline V12 engine.

Problems were encountered with the Kawasaki design, particularly with engine cooling, and the Mitsubishi Ki-30 received the production order. In spite of this, the pressing need for more aircraft in the Second Sino-Japanese War, which had started at full scale in July 1937, resulted in the Ki-32's entry into production as well, 12 months behind its rival. Ironically, the number of Ki-32s built was much higher than that of the successful Ki-30.

The Ki-32 entered production in 1938, designated as the Army Type 98 Single-engine Light Bomber. Kawasaki manufactured 854 Ki-32s before production ceased in May 1940.

Operational history

The Ki-32 saw extensive war service in the Second Sino-Japanese War, equipping the 3rd, 6th, 10th, 35th, 45th, 65th and 75th Sentai. It also saw combat during the Battle of Nomonhan against the Soviet Union in 1938–1939. Its last combat action was bombing Commonwealth forces during the Japanese invasion of Hong Kong in December 1941. After their withdrawal from front-line service in 1942, the Ki-32s were used in a training role.

During World War II, the Japanese also supplied Ki-32s to the Manchukuo Air Force to replace Manchukuo′s obsolescent Kawasaki Type 88/KDA-2 light bombers. Ki-32s were the main bomber of the Manchukuo Air Force throughout World War II.

Operators

Imperial Japanese Army Air Force
No. 3 Hikō Sentai IJAAF
No. 6 Hikō Sentai IJAAF
No. 10 Hikō Sentai IJAAF
No. 35 Hikō Sentai IJAAF
No. 45 Hikō Sentai IJAAF
No. 65 Hikō Sentai IJAAF
No. 75 Hikō Sentai IJAAF

Manchukuo Air Force

In 1945, Indonesian People's Security Force (IPSF) (Indonesian pro-independence guerrillas) captured a small number of aircraft at numerous Japanese air bases, including Bugis Air Base in Malang (repatriated 18 September 1945). Most aircraft were destroyed in military conflicts between the Netherlands and the newly proclaimed-Republic of Indonesia during the Indonesian National Revolution of 1945–1949.

Specifications

See also

References
Notes

Bibliography

  (new edition 1987 by Putnam Aeronautical Books, .)

External links

 Warbird Resource Group

Ki-32, Kawasaki
Ki-32, Kawasaki
Ki-032
Single-engined tractor aircraft
Aircraft first flown in 1937
Mid-wing aircraft